Peat and Diesel are a three-piece band from Stornoway on the Isle of Lewis, Scotland, comprising Calum “Boydie” MacLeod, Innes Scott and Uilly Macleod. The band formed over Saturday sessions at the band members' homes in Stornoway, and grew in popularity through exposure on social media. The band's songs mostly concern a humorous take on  island life, and are predominantly in English, although they include some Gaelic words and phrases.

In 2019, the band won "Live Act of the Year" at the Scots Trad Music Awards. In the 2020 awards they won "Best Music Video" (for Calum Dan’s Transit Van). They were also nominated for best album (for Light my Byre), but lost out to The Woods by Hamish Napier.

Current members
Calum 'Boydie' MacLeod (guitar and vocals)
Innes Scott (accordion)
Uilly Macleod (drums)

Discography

Studio albums

Live albums

References

External links

Scottish folk rock groups
Celtic rock groups
British musical trios
People from the Isle of Lewis